Aroa subnotata is a moth of the family Erebidae first described by Francis Walker in 1855. It is found in Sri Lanka.

References

Moths of Asia
Moths described in 1855